25 Oakhill Road is a Grade II listed house in Oakhill Road, Putney, London SW15.

History 

 It was built in 1880 as Briarbank, by the architect William Young for his wife's sister. Young lived next door at 23 Oakhill Road.

Historic England 

 The description of the house, provided by National Heritage:
 Main frontage 2-storeys and gable. 
 Yellow stocks, red brick dressings, and red rubbers. 
 Tiled roofs with ridge tiles. 
 Porch and 4-light canted bow to left, all beneath tiled lean-to roof: the porch with wooden turned pier and valance. 
 First floor wooden canted bow at left under cambered arch and 6-light mullion-and- transom window at right-hand angle. 
 Barge-boarded half-hipped gable with oriel, pargetted cove and vane. 
 To right 2-storey gabled bay with advanced 4-light ground floor window under lean- to roof, 4-light first floor window under cambered arch and bargeboarded gable. 
 Stacks with oversailing courses.
 This building is listed under the Planning (Listed Buildings and Conservation Areas) Act 1990 as amended for its special architectural or historic interest.

Random Information 

 Numerous residents have claimed to hear the ghost of an old woman in one of the upstairs bedrooms.
 There are two unmarked gravestones in the back garden.

References 

Houses in the London Borough of Wandsworth
Grade II listed houses in London
Putney
Houses completed in 1879
Grade II listed buildings in the London Borough of Wandsworth